Bad Traunstein (formerly Traunstein) is a market town and municipality in the district of Zwettl in the Austrian state of Lower Austria. In 2010 its official name was changed into Bad Traunstein, referring to the local spa complex that had been opened a few years earlier (cf. German bad 'spa').

Population

References

Cities and towns in Zwettl District
Spa towns in Austria